Abura/Asebu/Kwamankese District is one of the twenty-two districts in Central Region, Ghana. Originally created as an ordinary district assembly in 1988, which was created from the former Mfantsiman District Council. The district assembly is located in the southwest part of Central Region and has Essakyir as its capital town.

History
The ancient Akan Asebu Kingdom was also situated in this District.

Demographics
As of the 2010 Ghana census. Abura-Asebu-Kwamankese District had a population of 117,185.

List of settlements

References

Central Region (Ghana)
Districts of the Central Region (Ghana)